Laura Beth Smilowitz is an American physicist known for her development of technology that can record x-ray movies of explosions at high frame rates, and for shooting high explosives with lasers in order to synchronize their explosions with their recordings. She is a researcher at the Los Alamos National Laboratory, where she heads the Weapons Chemistry team in the Physical Chemistry and Applied Spectroscopy group.

Education and career
Smilowitz graduated from Bryn Mawr College in 1987, with a bachelor's degree in physics, and completed a Ph.D. in physics at the University of California, Santa Barbara in 1993. After postdoctoral research at the Los Alamos National Laboratory and Brandeis University, she became a permanent staff member at Los Alamos in 1999.

Recognition
In 2017, Smilowitz was named a Fellow of the American Physical Society (APS), after a nomination from the APS Topical Group on Shock Compression of Condensed Matter, "for pioneering radiography to study thermal explosions, including the development of both a scaled table-top dynamic radiographic facility capable of producing continuous X-ray movies of high speed events, and the triggering techniques required to observe the spontaneous onset of a thermal explosion". In the same year, she was also named a Fellow of the American Association for the Advancement of Science. She was named a Fellow of the Los Alamos National Laboratory in 2019.

References

Year of birth missing (living people)
Living people
American physicists
American women physicists
Bryn Mawr College alumni
University of California, Santa Barbara alumni
Los Alamos National Laboratory personnel
Fellows of the American Physical Society
Fellows of the American Association for the Advancement of Science
21st-century American women